Paulo Roberto Gonzaga (パウリーニョ, born January 26, 1989), most commonly known as Paulinho, is a Brazilian football midfielder who currently plays for Matsumoto Yamaga FC.

Club statistics
Updated to 24 February 2019.

References

External links

  Profile at Matsumoto Yamaga
 Profile
 Contract

1989 births
Living people
Brazilian footballers
Brazilian expatriate footballers
Grêmio Foot-Ball Porto Alegrense players
Association football midfielders
CR Vasco da Gama players
Tochigi SC players
Kawasaki Frontale players
JEF United Chiba players
Shonan Bellmare players
Matsumoto Yamaga FC players
Fagiano Okayama players
Campeonato Brasileiro Série A players
Campeonato Brasileiro Série B players
J1 League players
J2 League players
J3 League players
Brazilian expatriate sportspeople in Japan
Expatriate footballers in Japan